Michèle Stephenson is a Haitian filmmaker and former human rights attorney. Stephenson is known for her commitment to making personal human stories that are often excluded from mainstream media.

Career
With spouse Joe Brewster, Stephenson founded the Rada Film Group with a mission: to tell stories about communities that have been neglected by the mainstream media and contribute to the American narrative mosaic. Together, while raising a family in Brooklyn, New York, Brewster and Stephenson have directed and produced documentary and fiction films. In 2008, they directed Slaying Goliath, a documentary that follows 10 days in the life of their son's fifth grade basketball team from Harlem, New York as they experience culture clash at a national tournament in suburban Florida. Brewster and Stephenson also produced and directed Faces of Change, which follows five activists on five continents fighting racism in their communities.

In 1999, Brewster and Stephenson set out to document the experiences of their son and his best friend from the time both boys entered kindergarten at a private Manhattan prep school through their upcoming high school graduation in 2012 in the documentary film, American Promise. Their goal was to closely examine the coming of age and school experiences of two middle class African American boys at The Dalton School, a predominantly white prep school, in the context of the persistent U.S. achievement gap. American Promise was broadcast on POV in 2013. Brewster and Stephenson are Sundance Institute Fellows, Tribeca All Access Fellows, and the recipients of the Tribeca Gucci Fund for Documentary Film for the 13-year longitudinal documentary. American Promise is the centerpiece of a transmedia engagement campaign that will use mobile web and interactive technology to help propel young men of color to success.

Stephenson's work has appeared on PBS, Showtime, MTV and other outlets. 

Stephenson is one of the founders of and has co-produced several short documentaries in The Conversation, a series of Op Ed documentaries for the New York Times, including An Education in Equality, A Conversation With White People on Race, and A Conversation with Black Women on Race.

Stephenson has participated in a variety of speaking engagements and conferences addressing issues affecting communities of color. Stephenson, with husband Joe Brewster, has spoken at TFI Interactive Day 2014, and at events hosted by the Annie E Casey Foundation, OSI, and United Way.

Awards and recognition 
American Promise premiered at the 2013 Sundance Film Festival where it won the Special Jury Prize for Excellence in Filmmaking and was also part of the 2013 New York Film Festival's Main Slate. American Promise has received the Full Frame Festival Grand Jury Prize, Hot Springs Film Festival Best Documentary, and the PUMA Britdoc Impact Award. Stephenson and her husband Joe Brewster were also honored with an NAACP Image Award for their companion book, Promises Kept: Raising Black Boys to Succeed in School and in Life.

In 2018, she was awarded the Anonymous Was A Woman Award. Her 2020 film Stateless was a Canadian Screen Award nominee for Best Feature Length Documentary at the 9th Canadian Screen Awards in 2021.

Other honors include: Best Film Directed by a Woman of Color, ADFF; Grand Jury Prize for Best Documentary, ABFF; Diversity Award, SilverDocs International Documentary Film Festival; and the Henry Hampton Award for Excellence in Film and Digital Media.

References

Living people
Haitian activists
Haitian film directors
Haitian women film directors
Haitian documentary film directors
Date of birth missing (living people)
Women documentary filmmakers
Year of birth missing (living people)
Columbia Law School alumni
McGill University alumni